aka The Living Koheiji is a 1957 black-and-white musical Japanese film directed by Nobuo Aoyagi.

Cast
Nakamura Senjaku II as Koheiji
Kaoru Yachigusa as Ochika
Hiroshi Akutagawa as Takurō

References

External links
 

1957 films
Japanese musical films
Japanese black-and-white films
Films scored by Masaru Sato
1957 musical films
1950s Japanese films